The Big Bash League (BBL, also known as the KFC Big Bash League for sponsorship reasons) is an Australian professional Twenty20 cricket league, which was established in 2011 by Cricket Australia.

Listing notation

Team Notation 

 (3/200) indicates that a team scored 200 runs for three wickets and the innings was closed, either due to a successful run chase or if no playing time remained
 (200) indicates that a team scored 200 runs and was all out

Batting notation 

 (100) indicates that a batsman scored 100 runs and was out
 (100*) indicates that a batsman scored 100 runs and was not out

Bowling notation 

 (5–20) indicates that a bowler has captured 5 wickets while conceding 20 runs

Team records

Results summary

Notes:

  Teams that have won the title
 Tie+W and Tie+L indicates matches tied and then won or lost by "Super Over"
 The result percentage excludes no results and counts ties (irrespective of a tiebreaker) as half a win
 The total matches does not include matches played for Champions League T20

Highest Totals

Full Table on Cricinfo Last updated: 6th January 2023

Lowest Totals

Full Table on Cricinfo
 Last updated: 30 January 2022

Highest successful run chases

Last updated: 29 January 2022

Batting records

Most runs
Full Table on Cricinfo
 Last updated: 30 January 2023

Highest batting average

Minimum innings played - 10Full Table on Cricinfo
 Last updated: 30 January 2023

Highest individual score
Full Table on Cricinfo
 Last updated: 22 January 2023

Most sixes

Full Table on Cricinfo
 Last updated: 24 January 2023

Best strike rate

Minimum balls faced – 125
Full Table on Cricinfo
 Last updated: 24 January 2023

Most Ducks

Full Table on Cricinfo
 Last updated: 24 January 2023

Bowling records

Most wickets 

Full Table on Cricinfo
 Last updated: 30 January 2023

List of hat-tricks 

 Last updated: 16 January 2023

Best economy rates 

Full Table on Cricinfo Last updated: 7 January 2023

Best bowling figures by a debutant
Daniel Sams - 4/14 (4.0) for Sydney Sixers vs Sydney Thunder on 19 December 2017.

Partnership records

Highest partnership by wicket 

Full Table on Cricinfo Last updated: 29 January 2022

Highest partnership by runs

See also 

 List of Big Bash League centuries
 List of Big Bash League five-wicket hauls

References

External links 
 Big Bash League / Records - ESPN Cricinfo

Big Bash League|
Records
Big Bash League